The 2014 Golden Icons Academy Movie Awards is scheduled to hold at Stafford Center on October 25. The event will be hosted by comedian, Julius Agwu.

Awards

Best Motion Picture
A Mile from Home
Iyore
Being Mrs Elliot
Apaye
Accident (2013 film)
Dining with a Long Spoon

Best Drama
Murder at Prime Suites
Sisters at War
Black Silhouette
Knocking on Heaven's Door (2014 film)
Accident (2013 film)
Dark Side
A Mile from Home

Best Film (Indigenous) 
Akan
Sekunola
Chetanna
30 Days in Atlanta
Sundiata

Best Film (Comedy)
Hustlers
30 Days in Atlanta
Visa Lottery
A Wish
Nkasi the Village Fighter
Airline Babes

Best On-Screen Duo
 Rita Dominic & Joseph Benjamin (actor) – Iyore
 Ayo Makun & Ramsey Nouah – 30 Days in Atlanta
 Belinda Effah & Kanayo O. Kanayo – Apaye
Clarion Chukwura & Mercy Johnson – Hustlers
Nadia Buari & Jim Iyke – The Diary of Imogen Brown
Uche Jombo & Patience Ozokwor – After the Proposal
Tope Tedela & Chiedozie Nzeribe – A Mile from Home

Best Actor
Nonso Diobi – Last Three Digits
 Joseph Benjamin (actor) – Iyore
Bob-Manuel Udokwu – Dining with a Long spoon
Ramsey Nouah – 30 Days in Atlanta
Kalu Ikeagwu – Accident (2013 film)
Kanayo O. Kanayo – Apaye
Majid Michel – Being Mrs Elliot

Best Actress
Nse Ikpe Etim – Purple Rose
Rita Dominic – Iyore
Chioma Chukwuka – Accident (2013 film)
Omoni Oboli – Being Mrs Elliot
Jackie Appiah – Sisters at War
Ini Edo – Nkasi the Village Fighter
Clarion Chukwura – Apaye

Most Promising Actor
Daniel Lloyd – Stripped
Prince Mingle – Diary of Imogen Brown
McCarthy Nonwani – Chetanna
Shawn Faqua – Lagos Cougars
Tope Tedela – A Mile from Home
Blossom Chukwujekwu – Knocking on Heaven's Door (2014 film)
Emor Ekpenyong – Make a Move

Most Promising Actress
Sylvia Udeogu – Dark Side
Sonia Ibrahim – Number One Fan
Ivie Okujaye – Black Silhouette
Grace Johnson – All that Glitters
Adesua Etomi – Knocking on Heaven's Door (2014 film)
Diana Yekini – Lagos Cougars
Kafui Danku – Devil in a Dress

Best Supporting Actor
Femi Jacobs – Dreamwalker
Uti Nwachukwu – Don’t Cry for me
Wale Adebayo – Make a Move
Frederick Leonard (Nigerian actor) – Accident (2013 film)
Ayo Makun – Being Mrs Elliot
Eddie Watson – Sisters at War
Anthony Monjaro – After the Proposal

Best Supporting Actress
Ebele Okaro – Chetanna
Belinda Effah – Apaye
Susan Peters – Don’t Cry for Me
Roselyn Ngissah – Purple Rose
Okawa Shaznay – Sisters at War
Uru Eke – Dining with a Long Spoon
Tana Adelana – Dream walker

Best Comedic Act
Patience Ozokwor – After the Proposal
Lepacious Bose – Being Mrs Elliot
Ini Edo – Nkasi The Village Fighter
Mercy Johnson – Hustlers
Eniola Badmus – Airline Babes
Bishop Umeh – Visa Lottery
Ayo Makun – 30 Days in Atlanta

Best Screenplay
Last Three Digits
30 Days in Atlanta
Accident (2013 film)
Black Silhouette
Dining with a Long Spoon
Make a Move

Best Director
Eneaji Chris EnenG – Murder at Prime Suites
Teco Benson – Accident (2013 film)
Frank Rajah Arase – Iyore
Omoni Oboli – Being Mrs Elliot
Desmond Elliot – Apaye
Robert Peters – 30 Days in Atlanta
Eric Aghimien – A Mile from Home

Producer of the Year
Eric Aghimien – A Mile from Home
Juliet Ibrahim – Number One Fan
Frank Rajah Arase & Kwame Boadu – Iyore
Abdul Salam Mumuni – Sisters at War
Emem Isong – Apaye
Omoni Oboli & Nnamdi Oboli – Being Mrs Elliot
Ayo Makun & Dr. Kulah – 30 Days in Atlanta

Best Edited Film
Being Mrs Elliot
Accident (2013 film)
Apaye
One Last Word
Murder at Prime Suites
A Mile from Home

Best Cinematography
Murder at Prime Suites
Iyore
30 Days in Atlanta
Dining with a Long Spoon
A Mile from Home
My African Wedding
Black Silhouette

Best Sound
Make a Move
Knocking on Heaven's Door (2014 film)
Iyore
Accident (2013 film)
A Mile from Home
Number One Fan
Being Mrs Elliot

Best Costume
Murder at Prime Suites
Stripped
Iyore
Apaye
Make a Move
Destiny Child
Lagos Cougars

Best Makeup
A Mile from Home
Number One Fan
Iyore
Last Three Digits
Apaye
Murder at Prime Suites
One Last Word

Special Recognition
Lynn Whitfield – 30 Days in Atlanta

Best Film – Diaspora
Fall Guy
Captive
Faces of Love
Ekei
Brides War

Best Film Director – Diaspora
Ekei – Akim Macauley
Captive – John Uche
Fall Guy – Obed Joe
Faces of Love – Robert PetersA Message to Brian – A.B Sallu
Punch Rolla – Matt Lillard

Best Actor – Diaspora
Mohammed Bah – Fall Guy
Eno Williams – A Message to BrianRaz Adoti – Faces of Love
Moses Efret – Brides War
Kayode Akinbayo – Punch Rolla
Ken Monnette – The Storm

Best Actress – Diaspora
 Edith Pikwa Boma – A Message to Brian
 Paula Obaseki – Captive
 Laurene Noire – Captive
 Syr Law – Faces of Love
 Stephanie Maa – Ekei
 Melissa Determined – Brides War
 Bessy Ikem – American Mama

Male Viewer’s Choice
Uti Nwachukwu
Majid Michel
Chris Attoh
Joseph Benjamin (actor)
John Dumelo
Alex Ekubo
Yemi Blaq
Eddie Watson

Female Viewer’s Choice
Yvonne Nelson
Ini Edo
Jackie Appiah
Mercy Johnson
Uche Jombo
Nse Ikpe Etim
Tonto Dikeh
Yvonne Okoro

Grand Recogmition 
Captain (Dr.) Hosa Wells Okunbo

References

African film awards
2014 film awards